Yvan Frebert (born 19 November 1960) is a French former professional racing cyclist. He rode in two editions of the Tour de France.

References

External links
 

1960 births
Living people
French male cyclists
Sportspeople from Évreux
Cyclists from Normandy